Frigg is a chemical tanker operated by Nesskip of Iceland. It is named after the Norse Goddess of Wisdom, Frigg. In August 2001 the tanker was acquired by Icelandic shipping firm Nesskip along with MV Freyja (now known as ).

References

1982 ships
Ships built in Norway
Chemical tankers
Ships of Iceland